Xia Jiaping (born 1 March 1969) is a former professional tennis player from the People's Republic of China.

Biography
Xia, the grandson of a Chinese Davis Cup player, comes from Shanghai. 

In the 1990s he competed in the main draw of ATP Tour level tournaments in Beijing, Hong Kong and Shanghai. He was runner-up at a 1996 Challenger event in Beijing.

Representative career
During his career he represented the People's Republic of China in the Asian Games, Davis Cup and Summer Olympics. 

From 1989 to 1997, Xia played in a total of 18 Davis Cup ties for China. He won 20 singles matches, 29 overall, which is a team record.

At the 1990 Asian Games in Beijing he won two gold medals, in the men's doubles with Meng Qianghua and the other as a member of the men's team. 

He partnered Meng Qianghua again at the 1992 Atlanta Olympics, where they were beaten in the first round of the men's doubles by Switzerland's Jakob Hlasek and Marc Rosset. 

In Hiroshima in 1994 he won another Asian Games gold medal, with Li Fang in the mixed doubles. 

He also made the men's doubles draw at the 1996 Atlanta Olympics. With partner Pan Bing, the Chinese pairing won the first set of their opening round match against India's Mahesh Bhupathi and Leander Paes, before losing in three sets.

References

External links
 
 
 

1969 births
Living people
Chinese male tennis players
Olympic tennis players of China
Tennis players at the 1992 Summer Olympics
Tennis players at the 1996 Summer Olympics
Tennis players at the 1990 Asian Games
Tennis players at the 1994 Asian Games
Asian Games gold medalists for China
Asian Games medalists in tennis
Tennis players from Shanghai
Asian Games bronze medalists for China
Medalists at the 1990 Asian Games
Medalists at the 1994 Asian Games
Universiade medalists in tennis
Universiade gold medalists for China
Medalists at the 1991 Summer Universiade
20th-century Chinese people